John Mitchel GFC is a Gaelic Athletic Association club, established in Newry, County Down, Northern Ireland, in 1956, and is called after the Irish Patriot John Mitchel.  The club had the audacious ambition of winning the Down Senior Football Championship in five years and actually succeeded in four years, winning its first in 1960 and repeating the feat three more times in that decade in 1964, 1967 and 1968. Newry Mitchels forward Seán O'Neill also won 3 All-Ireland Senior Football Championships with Down and was picked on the Gaelic Athletic Association's teams of the Century and Millennium. Mitchels home pitch is Gerry Brown Park, Greenbank. The grounds are named after Gerry Brown, founding member. Gerry managed the Down Senior football team to All-Ireland success in 1968. The club also has club rooms in Kilmorey street, on the County Down side of Newry. Mitchels currently compete in the Down Junior Championship. Club colours are red and white. The club hosts an annual under 10 tournament known as 'The Mitchels Blitz' and 'The under ten All Ireland'.

Achievements
 Down Senior Football Championship: 1960, 1964, 1967, 1968
 Down Junior Football Championship

Notable players
 D. J. Kane
 Seán O'Neill

See also
Down Senior Club Football Championship
List of Gaelic Athletic Association clubs

External links
 John Mitchel GFC Newry (archived 2011)

Gaelic games clubs in County Down
Gaelic football clubs in County Down
Newry